is a passenger railway station located in the town of Minami, Kaifu District, Tokushima Prefecture, Japan. It is operated by JR Shikoku and has the station number "M18".

Lines

Layout
The station consists of two opposed side platforms serving two tracks, with a siding branching off track 1. The station premises occupy only a part of a large building which incorporates other facilities such as an aquarium/museum set up by the municipal authorities. The station ticket window has been unstaffed since 2010 but some types of tickets are sold by the museum, acting as a kan'i itaku agent. Access to the opposite platform is by means of a level crossing with ramps at both ends.

Platforms

Adjacent stations

History
On 1 April 1987, with the privatization of Japanese National Railways (JNR), the successor of JGR, JR Shikoku took over control of the station.

Passenger statistics
In fiscal 2019, the station was used by an average of 176 passengers daily

Surrounding area
 - An aquarium and other facilities set up by Minami town authorities and housed in the same building as the station. There is also a tourist information centre, an exhibition hall for local products, a shop for the sale of local produce and a food outlet where local foodstuffs can be sampled.
Minami Town National Health Insurance Minami Hospital
Minami Town Yuki Branch
Minami Municipal Yuki Elementary School
Minami Municipal Yuki Junior High School

See also
 List of Railway Stations in Japan

References

External links

 JR Shikoku timetable 

Railway stations in Tokushima Prefecture
Railway stations in Japan opened in 1939
Minami, Tokushima